Crocidomera fissuralis is a species of snout moth in the genus Crocidomera. It was described by Francis Walker in 1863, and is known from Hispaniola and Puerto Rico.

References

Moths described in 1863
Phycitinae